Aviludo–Louletano–Loulé Concelho is a Portuguese UCI Continental cycling team based in Loulé.

Team roster

Major wins

2006
GP Ciudade de Vigo, César Quitério
2007
Vuelta a Extremadura, Nuno Marta
Stage 1, André Vital
Stage 3, Nuno Marta
Stage 3 GP CTT Correios de Portugal, André Vital
2009
Stage 2 GP Torres Vedras, João Cabreira
Stage 4 Volta a Portugal, João Cabreira
Stage 4 Volta a Portugal, Eladio Jiménez
2010
Subida al Naranco, Santiago Pérez
 Overall Vuelta a Asturias, Constantino Zaballa
Stage 5, Constantino Zaballa
2012
Stage 1 Volta ao Alentejo, Jorge Montenegro
2013
 National U23 Road Race Championships, Victor Valinho
Stage 7 Volta a Portugal, Raúl Alarcón
Pan-American Championships ITT, Carlos Oyarzun
2015
 Overall Troféu Joaquim Agostinho, João Benta
Stage 1, João Benta
Stage 1 Volta a Portugal, Vicente Garcia de Mateos
2017
Classica Aldeias do Xisto, Vicente Garcia de Mateos
2018
 Overall Volta ao Alentejo, Luis Mendonça
Stage 3 Troféu Joaquim Agostinho, Óscar Hernández
Stages 2, 8 & 10 Volta a Portugal, Vicente Garcia de Mateos
2020
 National Road Race Championships, Sergey Shilov

Notes

References

External links

Cycling teams based in Portugal
UCI Continental Teams (Europe)
Cycling teams established in 1982
Sport in Loulé